Pudenak-e Jowngan (also Romanized as Pūdenak-e Jowngān; also known as Pīdanak, Pūdana, and Pūdenak) is a village in Bakesh-e Yek Rural District, in the Central District of Mamasani County, Fars Province, Iran. At the 2006 census, its population was 154, in 31 families.

References 

Populated places in Mamasani County